Antoni Słonimski (15 November 1895 – 4 July 1976) was a Polish poet, artist, journalist, playwright and prose writer, president of the Union of Polish Writers in 1956–1959 during the Polish October, known for his devotion to social justice.

Słonimski was the grandson of Hayyim Selig Slonimski, the founder of "ha-Tsefirah"- the first Hebrew weekly with an emphasis on the sciences. His father, an ophthalmologist, converted to Christianity when he married a Catholic woman. Słonimski was born in Warsaw and baptized and raised as a Christian. Słonimski studied at the Academy of Fine Arts in Warsaw. In 1919 he co-founded the Skamander group of experimental poets with Julian Tuwim and Jarosław Iwaszkiewicz. In 1924 he travelled to Palestine and Brasil and in 1932 to the Soviet Union.

Słonimski spent the war years in exile in England and France, returning to Poland in 1951. He worked as contributor to popular periodicals: Nowa Kultura (1950–1962), Szpilki (1953–73) and Przegląd Kulturalny. He was an active anti-Stalinist and supporter of liberalization. In 1964 he was one of the signatories and the main author of the so-called Letter of 34 to Prime Minister Józef Cyrankiewicz regarding freedom of culture. Słonimski died on 4 July 1976 in a car accident in Warsaw.

Works
 Sonety (1918)
 Parada (1920)
 Godzina poezji (1923)
 Torpeda czasu (Time Torpedo, 1926), a science fiction novel influenced by H.G. Wells
 Droga na wschód (Road to the East; 1924), a collection of poems inspired by his travels to Palestine and Brazil
 Z dalekiej podróży (1926)
 Rodzina (Family; 1933), a comedy about two brothers: a communist, and a fascist
 Okno bez krat (1935)
 Dwa końce świata (Two Ends of the World; 1937), a novel predicting Warsaw's destruction by a Nazi dictator
 Alarm (1940)
 Wiek klęski (1945)
 Nowe wiersze (1959)
 Wiersze 1958–1963 (1963)
 138 wierszy (1973)
Science Fiction
 Torpeda czasu (1924) Warszawa: Towarzystwo Wydawnicze "Ignis" (E. Wende i S-ka); drukowana odcinkach w drugiej połowie 1923 roku na łamach Kuriera Polskiego (nr 281–352), powojenne wydanie Warszawa: Czytelnik, 1967 (z przedmową Stanisława Lema)
 Dwa końce świata (1937) Warszawa: J. Przeworski, powojenne wydanie Warszawa: Książka i Wiedza, 1991

See also
 Polish literature

References

 Barry Keane, Skamander. The Poets and Their Poetry (2004), Agade; Warsaw, .

Sources
  "Antoni Slonimski." Encyclopædia Britannica Online

External links
 
 Profile of Antoni Słonimski at Culture.pl

1895 births
1976 deaths
Writers from Warsaw
People from Warsaw Governorate
Polish people of Jewish descent
Academy of Fine Arts in Warsaw alumni
Recipients of the Order of Polonia Restituta
Road incident deaths in Poland
20th-century Polish poets
20th-century Polish male writers
Recipients of the State Award Badge (Poland)